Zdeněk Pololáník (born 25 October 1935) is a Czech contemporary composer.

Family
His son Petr Pololáník is a conductor and orchestrator at Capellen Music Production.

Career
Zdeněk Pololáník has written nearly 700 compositions of various styles and genres. Since the 1960s, he became a sought-after composer of film music, sacred music and commissioned works. His music has been performed by prominent musicians, orchestras and choirs worldwide.

References

External links 
 
 Honorary citizenship of the market town of Ostrovačice

1935 births
Czech classical composers
Czech male classical composers
Czech classical organists
Male classical organists
Living people
Musicians from Brno
21st-century organists
21st-century Czech male musicians